Semyon Avangardovich Son is a Russian pianist, composer, professor of Barcelona Academy of Music.

Biography 
After graduating from Simferopol Music College and serving two years in the Soviet Army, Semyon entered Gnessin Russian Academy of Music, then - Moscow Conservatory studying piano and composition. According to teachers, the young man filed a great hope in classical and jazz music.
Semyon was a student of Russian composer Alemdar Karamanov. Maestro taught Senya the art of polyphony and symphonic orchestration. He improved his skills studying with famous artists such as Emil Gilels, Tatiana Nikolaeva, Inna and Evgeny Malinin, Henry Litinskii. As a student, he accompanied such singers as Zara Dolukhanova and Elena Obraztsova. Modern classics and jazz were later traced in his piano interpretations.

In 1987, Son created his own rock band "Joker" and the following year recorded his first album called "The Queen of Spades" in "Melody" company. At the same period, Senya Son opened his own recording studio, where he recorded soundtracks for feature films, documentaries, animated films, radio and television programs, using new trends in electronic and computer music.

After a ten-year break in his work, Senya Son came back to art and now he gives recitals throughout the world.

Merit 
Throughout his career, Senya Son collaborated with such conductors as Eduard Gulbis and Theodore Currentzis. Now Senya Son is a pianist who adds his amazing discoveries in harmonious language of famous works of Bach, Beethoven, Rachmaninoff, Tchaikovsky, Debussy, Ellington, Gershwin, Scriabin and others.

Senya Son repeatedly gave concerts in Japan, Australia, USA, France, Sweden, Spain and England. In particular, he gave recitals at Buckingham Palace in London for Queen Elizabeth II, at the Royal Palace in Stockholm,  at Pompidou Centre (France), at the 19 International Festival in El Jem (Tunisia), played with Elton John and Sting. For his contribution to global art, he was awarded the title of professor of Pablo Casals Barcelona Academy of Music.

Michel Legrand visited one of Senya's concerts in Paris. After listening to improvisation on the theme of "The Umbrellas of Cherbourg" he said: "This is one of the best piano adaptations that I have ever heard".

Soundtracks 
 1990 — Pugalo
 
 1990 — Winter in Paradise
 
 1990 — Wanderers’ halt
 
 1991 — Women astrology, or Extraterrestrial attraction
 
 1991 — Vampires of Geon
 
 1992 — Geon Masters
 
 1994 — AMBA (the first film)
 
 1994 — Nocturne for Drum and Motorcycle
 
 1995 — AMBA (the second film)
 
 2005 — Groom for Barbie
 
 2007 — Menu

Prizes and awards 
 Winner of “Maestro” award in Forte Del Miami (Italy).
 Winner of Pablo Casals award, Madrid (Spain).
 Winner of D.Shostakovich Exclusive jubilee medal (Russia).
 Winner of Arthur Rubinstein award in Los-Angeles (USA).
 Since 2006 he has been included in the English international catalogue of 17 exclusive pianists of the world.

References

External links
 The official website

1951 births
Living people
Russian male composers
Russian pianists
Male pianists
21st-century pianists
21st-century Russian male musicians